Teodor Axinte (born 2 February 2000) is a Romanian professional footballer who plays as a goalkeeper.

References

External links
 

Living people
Liga I players
Liga II players
Liga III players
2000 births
Sportspeople from Iași
Romanian footballers
Association football goalkeepers
FC Politehnica Iași (2010) players
CS Aerostar Bacău players
CSM Lugoj players
ACS Viitorul Târgu Jiu players